Vindeby is a town on the island of Tåsinge in south-central Denmark, in  Svendborg Municipality. It lies on the north coast of Tåsinge, across from Svendborg on the Funen side, to which it is connected by the Svendborgsund Bridge.

Notes 

Cities and towns in the Region of Southern Denmark
Svendborg Municipality